Banipur Mahila Mahavidyalaya, established in 1999, is a women's college in Banipur, Habra, West Bengal. It offers undergraduate courses in arts, commerce and sciences. It is affiliated to West Bengal State University.

Departments

Arts
Bengali
English 
History
Political Science
Sociology
Philosophy
Education

See also
Education in India
List of colleges in West Bengal
Education in West Bengal

References

External links
Official website

Educational institutions established in 1999
Colleges affiliated to West Bengal State University
Women's universities and colleges in West Bengal
1999 establishments in West Bengal